Cyproconazole is an agricultural fungicide of the class of azoles, used on cereal crops, coffee, sugar beet, fruit trees and grapes, on sod farms and golf courses and on wood as a preservative. It was introduced to the market by then Sandoz in 1994 (which is Syngenta as of 2000).

Mechanism of action
Cyproconazole inhibits demethylation, a particular step in the synthesis of a component of the fungal cell wall called sterol. This means it affects fungal growth, but not the fungal sporulation. This explains why it must be used when fungal growth is maximum, early in the infection, because in late infections fungal growth slows down and the agent is ineffective.

Use

Formulations
Many different formulations exist with imazalil, difenoconazole, prochloraz, propiconazole, chlorothalonil, cyprodinil, fludioxonil, azoxystrobin, and copper. In wood preservatives it is mixed with didecyldimethylammonium chloride.
It is the active ingredient in two foliar fungicides for soybeans in the U.S., Alto X, and mixed with azoxystrobin in Quadris Xtra, both by Syngenta.
It is also manufactured by Bayer CropScience and Dow AgroSciences.

Application
Cyproconazole is used against powdery mildew, rust on cereals  and apple scab, and applied by air or on the ground to cereal crops, coffee, sugar beet, fruit trees and grapes. 
It controls the following pests: Puccinia graminis, Puccinia spp., Pseudocercosporella herpotrichoides and Septoria species. It can be used on above-ground wood to prevent it from decay from fungi as an alternative to Chromated Copper Arsenate. It was originally marketed for use on sod farms and golf courses 
In the U.S., chemigation is allowed with less than half inch application, aerial spraying with a 5 gpa minimum, ground application is adequate for coverage and canopy penetration. The re-rentry interval is 12 hours. Reapplication within 30 days of harvest is not permitted.

Hazards
The European Community classifies cyproconazole into carcinogen category 3 as limited evidence, into the reproduction risk category 3 as "possible risk of harm to the unborn child", as harmful if swallowed, and dangerous for the environment, because very toxic to aquatic organisms, possibly  causing long-term adverse effects in the aquatic environment.

Cyproconazole was a reproductive toxicant in EPA's 2011 predictive model of reproductive toxicity using Toxcast high-throughput screening. 
Cyproconazole like fluconazole, a triazole used in human medicine, can induce liver swelling in mice.  the constitutive androstane receptor has been shown to be mediator for this effect.
Cyproconazole has been shown to cause a dose dependent inhibition of progesterone production in human placental cells in vitro.

Toxicokinetics
Cyproconazole as other triazoles inhibits the enzyme cytochrome P-450, so it can no longer demethylate lanosterol, an intermediate needed in ergosterol synthesis. In fish, CYP mediated steroid metabolism  and  xenobiotic metabolism can be affected in opposite ways. The half-life of cyproconazole in trout was about 1.0 day.

Resistance
Development of fungal resistance can be prevented by not using cyproconazole "repeatedly alone in the same season" or by not using it late in the infection, that is, curatively. Fungi can develop resistance if the same fungicide is used repeatedly or when fungicides with the same mode of action are repeatedly.(package insert Alto 100Syngenta)

Regulation
In the U.S. Sandoz applied for registration under the Federal Insecticide, Fungicide, and Rodenticide Act (FIFRA) with the U.S. EPA in 1988, and cyproconazole was approved on December 22, 1993. 
In 2006, EPA settled with Syngenta for $15,600, because they failed to report cyproconazole production in India and Switzerland. 
In 2007, the U.S. Environmental Protection Agency had issued a Section 18 quarantine exemption for using Syngenta's then unregistered cyproconazole product "Alto 100 SL" against Asian soybean rust in soybeans, and in 2008, it issued a Section 3 registration.
In 2009, Syngenta applied for full registration of cyproconazole use on soybean.
In 2012, Syngenta requested the EPA to establish regulations for residues of cyproconazole in or on peanut including nutmeat, peanut hay, peanut meal, peanut butter and refined oil, which as of 2015 was still under review.

In Europe, Syngenta had applied for registration in 2009 and the European Food Safety Authority recommended cyproconazole be registered in 2010.

References

External links
 Cyproconazole, Pesticide Properties DataBase, University of Hertfordshire, U.K., 26 June 2015, accessed 19 September 2015

Fungicides
Crop protection
Triazole antifungals
Tertiary alcohols
Cyclopropanes
Chloroarenes
Lanosterol 14α-demethylase inhibitors